Kerry Mills (né Frederick Allen Mills; 1 February 1869 in Philadelphia – 5 December 1948 in Hawthorne, California), publishing also as F.A. Mills was an American ragtime composer and music publishing executive of popular music during the Tin Pan Alley era. His stylistically diverse music ranged from ragtime through cakewalk to marches. He was most prolific between 1895 and 1918.

Career 

Mills trained as a violinist and was head of the Violin Department of the University of Michigan School of Music when he began composing.  He moved to New York City in 1895 and started a music publishing firm, (F. A. Mills Music Publisher), publishing his own work and that of others.

Selected works 
 "Impecunious Davis"
 "In The City Of Sighs And Tears"
 "Just For The Sake Of Society" 
 "Let's All Go Up To Maud's"
 "The Longest Way 'Round Is The Sweetest Way Home"
 "Meet Me in St. Louis, Louis" (words by Andrew B. Sterling)
1895 : Rastus on Parade - Characteristic Two Step March for Piano
1895 : Shandon Bells - Two Step March
1896 : Happy Days in Dixie - Characteristic March
1897 : At A Georgia Camp Meeting - A Characteristic March listen to:https://www.youtube.com/watch?v=lLR2ZI0evgs
1899 : Whistling Rufus - Characteristic Two Step March, Polka & Cakewalk
1899 : Impecunious Davis - A Characteristic March
1900 or before: Cake-Walk
1900 : Kerry Mills Medley - Themes from Previous Cake Walk and Songs
1902 : Harmony Moze - Characteristic Two Step
1902 : A Brand Plucked from the Burning (words by Alfred Bryan)
1902 : I Know She Waits for Me (words by Alfred Bryan)
1903 : Valse Hèléne
1903 : Petite Causerie - A Quiet Chat
1903 : Valse Primrose - Les Primevères
1903 : 'Leven Forty-Five From The Hotel - Two Step March
1903 : Me and Me Banjo - Characteristic Piece
1903 : Petite Causerie (A Quiet Chat) 
1903 : Valse Helene 
1903 : L'amour Aux Bois (Cupid's Bower)
1903 : Valse Primrose (Les Primeveres)
1903 : Like A Star That Falls From Heaven (words by Alfred Bryan)
1904 : We'll Be Together When the Clouds Roll By (words by Alfred Bryan)
1906 : Old Heidelberg: - Characteristic Two Step March
1906 : While The Old Mill Wheel Is Turning (words by Will D. Cobb)
1907 : Red Wing" - An Indian Intermezzo (words by Thurland Chattaway).  Mills adapted the melody from Schumann's "The Happy Farmer"
1908 : Kerry Mills Barn Dance
1908 : Sun Bird - Intermezzo
1908 : Hallie (A Little Romance)
1908 : Sweet Sixteens - March
1908 : Any Old Port in a Storm (words by Arthur J. Lamb)
1908 : If You Were Mine (words by Arthur J. Lamb)
1909 : Comical Eyes (words by Bartley C. Costello)
1909 : Kerry Mills Rag Time Dance
1909 : A Georgia Barn Dance
1909 : The Scarf Dancer - A Novelty Two Step
1909 : Lily of the Prairie - Two Step Intermezzo
1909 : Sicilian Chimes - Reverie
1909 : Kerry Mills Potpourri
1909 : Don't Be an Old Maid, Molly
1909 : Where Were You Last Night? (words by Alfred Bryan)
1910 : That Fascinating Ragtime Glide
1910 : Valley Flower - Intermezzo
1910 : Kerry Mills Palmetto Slide
1910 : The Wyoming Prance - A Rag Time Two Step
1910 : I've Lost My Nannie
1911 : You've Got the Wrong Number, But You've Got the Right Girl (words by Arthur J. Lamb)
1914 : Kerry Mills Turkey Trot
1914 : Kerry Mills Fox Trot
1918 : Snooky Hollow - Intermezzo
1919 : Tokio - Fox Trot on Chorus from Geisha Girl

See also
List of ragtime composers

External links

 Sheet music for his song "We'll Be Together When the Clouds Roll By" from the collection at University of Oregon Libraries
 
 Kerry Mills recordings at the Discography of American Historical Recordings.

References 

1869 births
1948 deaths
American male composers
American composers
Musicians from Hawthorne, California
Ragtime composers
University of Michigan faculty